Wag's was a chain of casual dining (or "family") restaurants owned and operated by Walgreens in the 1970s and 1980s. They were modeled after restaurants like Denny's, Shoney's, and Big Boy in that they were mostly 24-hour establishments specializing in inexpensive fare such as hamburgers and breakfast. The chain was based on smaller restaurants that existed in some of the larger Walgreens stores.

Walgreens sold all 91 freestanding stores to Marriott Corporation in 1988, retaining only a few locations that were situated in malls. Soon after this, Marriott began selling off its assets, including Marriott's Great America.  Unable to find a buyer for most of the restaurants, the Wag's chain was completely out of business by 1991.  However, the 30 Wag's restaurants in the Chicago Metropolitan area were sold to Lunan Corporation (large Arby's franchisee in Chicago) and run by Lunan Family Restaurants. Over the course of 2 years, each Wag's restaurant continued to do business as Wag's until converted to a Shoney's restaurant. Lunan Family Restaurants went out of business in 1994 and the Shoney's locations were sold to various chains or individuals. Some locations continue to this day as IHOP restaurants. Marriott itself ceased operations in 1993, when they split into two new entities.

See also

Lunch counter

References 

Regional restaurant chains in the United States
Defunct restaurant chains in the United States